In Greek mythology, Mneme  was one of the three original Boeotian muses, along with her sisters Aoede and Melete before Arche and Thelxinoë were identified, increasing the number to five. Later, the Nine Olympian Muses were named. Mneme was the muse of memory.

Pausanias 9.29 (2nd Century AD) treats obscure source material already obsolete in his own day. Citing the Atthis by Hegesinus — a poem no longer extant for Pausanias but cited by Callippus of Corinth (whose history of Orchomenus is no longer extant for us) — Pausanias records that anciently a group of three Boeotian Muses was venerated on Mt Helicon. These were displaced by a cult of nine Muses.

Namesake
 Mneme Lake in Antarctica is named after the muse.
 Jupiter's moon Mneme is named after the muse

See also
 Meme
 Memo (disambiguation)
 Memento (disambiguation)

References

Greek Muses
Greek goddesses
Boeotian characters in Greek mythology